William Michael Duffy (November 24, 1888 – May 17, 1953) was an American football player and coach. He served as the head football coach at the University of Louisville from 1915 to 1916, compiling a record of 3–8–2. Duffy died of a heart attack on May 17, 1953, while making a speech at St. Bartholomew Church in Buechel, Louisville.

Head coaching record

College

References

External links
 

1888 births
1953 deaths
Centre Colonels football players
Louisville Cardinals football coaches
High school football coaches in Kentucky
Coaches of American football from Kentucky
Players of American football from Louisville, Kentucky